Jimilimé is a large village located on the island of Anjouan in the Comoros. 

The mountain range consuming the North-Eastern region of the island is also commonly called by the same name, Jimilimé.

The village is known for its winding road and distance from other villages. Jimilimé lacked a formal road built for a vehicle until around the early 2000s.

Donkeys were historically a very common mode of transporting goods to and from neighboring villages and are still commonly used within the village. Jimilimé has a large population of farmers and is a major producer of cloves (also known as kalafu in the local dialect of Shindzuani).

Populated places in Anjouan